Pochinok-2 is a rural locality (a village) in Sosnovskoye Rural Settlement, Vologodsky District, Vologda Oblast, Russia. The population was 2 as of 2002.

Geography 
The distance to Vologda is 31.5 km, to Sosnovka is 12 km. Pirogovo is the nearest rural locality.

References 

Rural localities in Vologodsky District